Americana is the 31st studio album by Canadian / American musician Neil Young, released on June 5, 2012. The album was Young's first collaboration with backing band Crazy Horse since their 2003 album, Greendale, and its associated tour.

Background 
American Songwriter quoted Young as saying this about the tone and intent of the album:

Critical reception

Americana received strongly polarized reviews from music critics. It holds an average score of 68 out of 100 at Metacritic, based on 31 reviews. Greg Kot of the Chicago Tribune gave the album three-and-a-half out of four stars, writing that "Americana reveals the hard truth inside songs that have been taken for granted." Dan Forte, in Vintage Guitar, said "this may be his best since Rust [Never Sleeps]." Johnny Dee in his review for the magazine Classic Rock remarks how "Young has picked every song apart, reworked melody and lyrics and made them his own", making them better for it.

In a mixed review, Michael Hann of The Guardian found the album "impossibly pointless" and felt that some songs exhibit "sloppiness" and "unnecessary lengths". NME reviewer considers the album "largely  sub-standard covers of folk songs."

Robert Christgau named Americana the best album of 2012 in his year-end list for The Barnes & Noble Review, and cited it as one of his top 25 albums of the 2010s decade.

Track listing

Personnel
Neil Young – vocals, guitar
Crazy Horse
Billy Talbot – bass, vocals
Ralph Molina – drums, vocals
Frank "Poncho" Sampedro – guitar, vocals
Additional personnel
Dan Greco – orchestral cymbals, tambourine
Americana Choir – vocals
Pegi Young – vocals on "This Land is Your Land"
Stephen Stills –  vocals on "This Land is Your Land"

Audio production
Produced by Neil Young and John Hanlon with Mark Humphreys
Recorded and mixed by John Hanlon
Engineered by John Hanlon with John Hausmann and Jeff Pinn
Recorded at Audio Casa Blanca
Mixed at Redwood Digital's Analog Mixing Room
Digital mastering to 24-bit/192 kHz by Tim Mulligan at Redwood Digital. Analog to Digital Transfers by John Nowland at His Master’s Wheels
Choir recorded at East West Studios, L.A.
East West engineers assisting John Hanlon and John Hausmann: Jeremy Miller, Ben O'Neill
Choir director: Darrell Brown
Choir arrangements: Neil Young and Darrell Brown
Copiest: Lennie Moore
Choir conductor: Tim Davis
Choir: Zander Ayeroff, Lydia Bachman, Emmeline Lehmann Boddicker, Vilem Lehmann Boddicker, Joshua Britt, Mariah Britt, Willa Griffin, Nicholas Harper, Ryan Lisack, Rowen Merrill, Zoe Merrill, Megan Muchow, Nolan Muchow, Rennon O'Neal, Daniel O'Brien, Kiana Scott
Direction: Elliot Roberts for Lookout Management

Blu-ray production
Original concept: Gary Burden
Director: Bernard Shakey
Producer: Will Mitchell
Executive producer: Elliot Rabinowitz
Post production at Upstream Multimedia
Art direction: Toshi Onuki
Editors: Mark Faulkner, Will Mitchell, Atticus Culver-Rease

Americana Choir video
Produced and directed by Shakey Pictures
Camera: Benjamin Johnson
Editor: Mark Faulkner
Americana film research: Gary Burden, Cameron Kunz, Will Mitchell, Sarah Yee
Blu-ray authoring, programming at MX  San Francisco, CA

Charts

Weekly charts

Year-end charts

References

External links 
 Americana at AnyDecentMusic?

Neil Young albums
Crazy Horse (band) albums
2012 albums
Reprise Records albums
Albums produced by John Hanlon
Americana albums